Matthew Wilson, known as Matt Wilson and nicknamed Daddy Wilson (1842 – 20 May 1897) was an Irish international footballer who played club football for Distillery as a right back.

Wilson earned three caps for Ireland at the 1884 British Home Championship.

Wilson played alongside his son Bob in the 1886 Irish Cup Final.

External links
NIFG profile

1842 births
1897 deaths
Irish association footballers (before 1923)
Pre-1950 IFA international footballers
Lisburn Distillery F.C. players
Association football defenders